Jeffrey Owen Hawkes (born 3 September 1953) is a South African professional golfer.

Hawkes was born in Mthatha (then Umtata), Eastern Cape. In addition to his home in Bruma near Johannesburg, he also resides in Bracknell, Berkshire, England.

Hawkes turned professional in 1974. He played on the European Tour for over twenty years, making the top one hundred on the European Tour Order of Merit every year from 1977 to 1991, with a best ranking of 34th in 1987. His sole European Tour win came at the 1991 Canon European Masters Swiss Open. He has also won three tournaments on the Southern Africa Tour, now the Sunshine Tour.

Hawkes joined the European Seniors Tour in 2004, but has yet to win at that level, although his playing schedule is rather limited as he also works as a golf commentator and analyst for Sky Sports in the United Kingdom.

Professional wins (5)

European Tour wins (1)

Sunshine Tour wins (3)
1988 Bloemfontein Classic
1989 A.E.C.I. Classic, Hollard Royal Swazi Sun Classic

Other wins (1)
1979 Rolex Pro-Am (Switzerland)

Results in major championships

Note: Hawkes only played in The Open Championship.

CUT = missed the half-way cut (3rd round cut in 1977 and 1982 Open Championships)
"T" = tied

Team appearances
Amateur
Eisenhower Trophy (representing South Africa): 1974

Professional
Hennessy Cognac Cup (representing the Rest of the World): 1982

See also 

 Spring 1980 PGA Tour Qualifying School graduates

References

External links

South African male golfers
Sunshine Tour golfers
European Tour golfers
European Senior Tour golfers
Golf writers and broadcasters
South African people of British descent
Sportspeople from the Eastern Cape
People from Mthatha
1953 births
Living people